Rudy D'Amico (born August 18, 1940) is a National Basketball Association (NBA) scout, and former college basketball and professional coach. He was the head coach of Maccabi Tel Aviv, and he led them to the FIBA European Champions Cup (EuroLeague) championship in 1981.  He scouts for the Orlando Magic.

Early life
D'Amico, the son of Italian-born parents, was born in Queens, New York, grew up in Astoria and attended Newtown High School.  He then attended Seattle University, and in 1961 won letters in both basketball and baseball.  He also earned a master's degree from New York University.

Basketball coaching career
D'Amico was head basketball coach at Brooklyn College in the Knickerbocker Conference, from 1967 until 1977.  In 1973, he coached Brooklyn College to the CUNYAC Basketball Championship, defeating City College.

From 1980 to 1991, he coached professional basketball in Europe and Israel, from 1985–90 with Pallacanestro Firenze of the Italian A League.  He also coached Zaragoza of the Spanish League, and Bologna in Italy, as well as in the Puerto Rican Superior League.  In 1981, he coached the Israeli Super League team, Maccabi Tel Aviv, to the FIBA European Champions Cup (EuroLeague) championship over Synudine Bologna in the Finals.

Basketball scouting career
In 1999, he became the NBA's Cleveland Cavaliers' international scout, advising general manager Jim Paxson.  In 2005, he was the NBA European scout of the Cleveland Cavaliers.  He now scouts for the Orlando Magic.

See also
List of EuroLeague-winning head coaches

References

External links
Sports-Reference Player Profile
Italian League Coach Profile 

1940 births
Living people
Basketball coaches from New York (state)
American basketball scouts
American men's basketball coaches
American men's basketball players
American people of Italian descent
Brooklyn Bulldogs men's basketball coaches
Brooklyn College faculty
CB Zaragoza coaches
Cleveland Cavaliers scouts
College men's basketball head coaches in the United States
EuroLeague-winning coaches
FC Mulhouse Basket coaches
Fortitudo Pallacanestro Bologna coaches
Italian basketball players
Italian basketball coaches
Maccabi Tel Aviv B.C. coaches
Montecatiniterme Basketball coaches
New York University alumni
Orlando Magic personnel
Pallacanestro Trieste coaches
Scaligera Basket Verona coaches
Seattle Redhawks baseball players
Seattle Redhawks men's basketball players
Sportspeople from Brooklyn
Sportspeople from Queens, New York
Basketball players from New York City
American expatriate basketball people in Israel
American expatriate basketball people in Spain
American expatriate basketball people in Italy
American expatriate basketball people in France
Baseball players from New York City